Arun Chandra High School is a secondary school in Noakhali District, Bangladesh. It was established in 1914.

References 

Schools in Noakhali District
High schools in Bangladesh